Pelagornis is a widespread genus of prehistoric pseudotooth birds. These were probably rather close relatives of either pelicans and storks, or of waterfowl, and are here placed in the order Odontopterygiformes to account for this uncertainty.

Description 
 

The fossil specimens show that P. miocaenus was one of the larger pseudotooth birds, hardly smaller in size than Osteodontornis or the older Dasornis. Unlike in its contemporary Osteodontornis but like in the older Pseudodontornis, between each two of Pelagorniss large "teeth" was a single smaller one. Pelagornis differed from Dasornis and its smaller contemporary Odontopteryx in having no pneumatic foramen in the fossa pneumotricipitalis of the humerus, a single long latissimus dorsi muscle attachment site on the humerus instead of two distinct segments, and no prominent ligamentum collaterale ventrale attachment knob on the ulna. Further differences between Odontopteryx and Pelagornis are found in the tarsometatarsus: in the latter, it has a deep fossa of the hallux' first metatarsal bone, whereas its middle-toe trochlea is not conspicuously expanded forward. The salt glands inside the eye sockets were extremely large and well-developed in Pelagornis. From the humerus pieces of specimen LACM 127875, found in the Eo-Oligocene Pittsburg Bluff Formation near Mist, Oregon (United States), P. miocaenus differs in an external tuberosity that is not as much extended shoulderwards and that is separated from the elbow end by a wider depression. The head of the humerus is turned more to the inward side and the large protuberance found there is not as far towards the end. The Waipara River humerus mentioned above agrees with P. miocaenus in that respect. If the Oregon fossils are related to Cyphornis and/or Osteodontornis, and if the traits as found in P. miocaenus and the New Zealand specimen are apomorphic, the latter two may indeed be very close relatives.

 Taxonomy 

Four species have been formally described, but several other named taxa of pseudotooth birds might belong in Pelagornis too. The type species Pelagornis miocaenus is known from Aquitanian (Early Miocene) sediments – formerly believed to be of Middle Miocene age – of Armagnac (France). The original specimen on which P. miocaenus was founded was a left humerus almost the size of a human arm. The scientific name – "the most unimaginative name ever applied to a fossil" in the view of Storrs L. Olson – does in no way refer to the bird's startling and at that time unprecedented proportions, and merely means "Miocene pelagic bird". Like many pseudotooth birds, it was initially believed to be related to the albatrosses in the tube-nosed seabirds (Procellariiformes), but subsequently placed in the Pelecaniformes where it was either placed in the cormorant and gannet suborder (Sulae) or united with other pseudotooth birds in a suborder Odontopterygia.

While P. miocaenus was the first pseudotooth bird species to be described scientifically, its congener Pelagornis mauretanicus was only named in 2008. It was a slightly distinct and markedly younger species. Its remains have been found in 2.5 Ma Gelasian (Late Pliocene/Early Pleistocene, MN17) deposits at Ahl al Oughlam (Morocco).

 
Additional fossils are placed in Pelagornis, usually without assignment to species, mainly due to their large size and Miocene age. From the United States, such specimens have been found in the Middle Miocene Calvert Formation of Maryland and Virginia, and in the contemporary Pungo River Formation of the Lee Creek Mine in North Carolina (though at least one other pelagornithid is probably represented among this material too). USNM 244174 (a tarsometatarsus fragment) was found near Charleston, South Carolina and assigned to P. miocaenus, and the slightly smaller left tarsometatarsal middle trochlea USNM 476044 might also belong here. A broken but fairly complete sternum probably of this genus, specimen LHNB (CCCP)-1, is known from the Serravallian-Tortonian boundary (Middle to Late Miocene) near Costa da Caparica in Portugal. Contemporary are certain specimens
 from the Bahía Inglesa Formation of Chile, while other material from this formation as well as remains from the Pisco Formation of Peru are from the Late Miocene to Early Pliocene. It is not clear whether the South American fossils – of similar size and age and not including directly comparable bones – are from one or two species. A very worn sternum and some other remains from the Miocene of Oregon as well as roughly contemporary material from California are sometimes assigned to Pelagornis, but this appears to be an error; if not of the contemporary North Pacific Osteodontornis, the specimen is better regarded as indeterminable. Given the distance in space and time involved, all Pacific material may well have been a species different from P. miocaenus or even from birds closer to Osteodontornis. Indeed, some of the older Bahía Inglesa Formation remains tentatively referred to Pelagornis were at first assigned to the mysterious Pseudodontornis longirostris in error, and a proximal (initially misidentified as distal) humerus piece (CMNZ AV 24,960), from the Waiauan (Middle-Late Miocene) cliffs near the mouth of the Waipara River (North Canterbury, New Zealand) seems to differ little from either O. orri or P. miocaenus. The Pisco Formation specimens – which may be from the same species as the Bahía Inglesa ones, or from its direct descendant – on the other hand seem to be well distinct from Osteodontornis. It must be remembered, however, that the Isthmus of Panama had not been formed yet during the Miocene.

A new species of Pelagornis was described in July 2014, Pelagornis sandersi. It is believed to have had a wingspan of at least , making it the largest flying bird ever.

 Synonyms and relationships 
 
A humerus from the Muséum d'Histoire naturelle de Bordeaux was labelled "Pelagornis Delfortrii 1869". Though the name from the label had been listed in the synonymy of P. miocaenus, neither does it seem to be a validly established taxon nor was the specimen compared with P. miocaenus remains. It seems to refer to one of the syntypes of the procellariiform Plotornis delfortrii – found at Léognan (France) and also of Aquitanian age – from which that species was described in the 1870s by Alphonse Milne-Edwards: when the nomen nudum "Pelagornis delfortrii" is listed in the synonymy of P. miocaenus, the pseudotooth bird is claimed to be known from the Léognan deposits also, whereas it has not actually been found there. Pseudodontornis, meanwhile, is a generally Paleogene genus of huge pseudotooth birds. All its species are not uncommonly considered synonymous with earlier-described taxa. The (probably) Eo-Oligocene type species Pseudodontornis longirostris might belong in Pelagornis, though given its uncertain age and provenance a comparison with undisputed Pelagornis material – which is currently lacking – would seem to be necessary before such a step is taken. In that respect, Palaeochenoides mioceanus was also hypothesized to include P. longirostris, and would need to be compared with Pelagornis to see whether it does not belong here too.

There has been little dedicated study of the relationships of Pelagornis, for while quite a lot of remains are known from the present genus, those of most other pseudotooth birds are few and far between and direct comparisons are further hampered by the damaged state of most remains. The large Gigantornis eaglesomei from the Middle Eocene Atlantic was established based on a broken but not too incomplete sternum and might actually belong in Dasornis. In Gigantornis the articular facet for the furcula consists of a flat section at the very tip of the sternal keel and a similar one set immediately above it at an outward angle, and the spina externa is shaped like an Old French shield in cross-section. The slightly smaller LHNB (CCCP)-1 has a less sharply protruding sternal keel, the articular facet for the furcula consists of a large knob at the forward margin, and the spina externa is narrow in cross-section. While these differences are quite conspicuous, the two fossils are clearly of closely related huge dynamically soaring seabirds, and considering the 30 million years or so that separate Gigantornis and LHNB (CCCP)-1, the Paleogene taxon may be very close to the Miocene bird's ancestor nonwithstanding their differences.

In any case, the family name of the pseudotooth birds, Pelagornithidae, as the senior synonym has widely replaced the once-commonly used Pseudodontornithidae. It may be that Pseudodontornis belongs to a distinct lineage of these birds, and then the family name would perhaps be revalidated. Also, the presumed similarity between Dasornis and the smaller Odontopteryx seems to be a symplesiomorphy that is not informative regarding their relationships to each other and with Pelagornis. Rather, it is likely that the huge pseudotooth birds form a clade, and in this case, Pseudodontornithidae like Cyphornithidae and Dasornithidae is correctly placed in the synonymy of Pelagornithidae even if several families were accepted in the Odontopterygiformes.

 Distribution 
Fossils of Pelagornis have been found in:

Eocene
 Aridal Formation (Bartonian), Morocco

Oligocene
 Chandler Bridge Formation, South Carolina

Miocene
 Black Rock Sandstone, Australia 
 Bahía Inglesa Formation (Mayoan-Montehermosan), Chile 
 Molasse Coquilliere Formation, France 
 Calvert Formation, Virginia
 Waipara River mouth (Waiauan), Canterbury, New Zealand 
 Pisco Formation (Chasicoan-Huayquerian), Peru 
 Costa de Caparica or Fonte de Pipa, Tagus Basin, Portugal
 Castillo (Colhuehuapian-Santacrucian) and Capadare Formations (Laventan-Mayoan), Venezuela

Pliocene
 Greta Formation, New Zealand
 Purisima Formation, California and Yorktown Formation, North Carolina

Early Pleistocene
 Ahl al Oughlam, Morocco

 References 

 Bibliography 

  Electronic supplement (requires subscription)
 
 Chávez, Martín; Stucchi, Marcelo & Urbina, Mario (2007): El registro de Pelagornithidae (Aves: Pelecaniformes) y la Avifauna Neógena del Pacífico Sudeste [The record of Pelagornithidae (Aves: Pelecaniformes) and the Neogene avifauna of the southeast Pacific]. Bulletin de l’Institut Français d’Études Andines 36(2): 175–197 [Spanish with French and English abstracts]. PDF fulltext
 
 
 
 
 Mayr, Gerald (2009): Paleogene Fossil Birds. Springer-Verlag, Heidelberg & New York. 
  
 
 Mlíkovský, Jirí (2002): Cenozoic Birds of the World, Part 1: Europe. Ninox Press, Prague.
 
 NASA Earth Observatory (NEO) (2008): Panama: Isthmus that Changed the World. Version of 2008-SEP-22. Retrieved 2009-SEP-24.
 National Museum of Natural History Department of Paleobiology (NMNH-DP) [2009]: Paleobiology Collections Search. Version of 2009-AUG-07. Retrieved 2009-AUG-22.
 Olson, Storrs L. (1985): The Fossil Record of Birds. In: Farner, D. S.; King, J. R. & Parkes, Kenneth C. (eds.): Avian Biology 8: 79–252.
 
 Rincón R., Ascanio D. & Stucchi, Marcelo (2003): Primer registro de la familia Pelagornithidae (Aves: Pelecaniformes) para Venezuela [First record of Pelagornithidae family from Venezuela]. Boletín de la Sociedad Venezolana de Espeleología 37''': 27–30 [Spanish with English abstract]. PDF fulltext
 
 Walsh, Stig A. (2000): Big-chested birds – exciting new avian material from the Neogene of Chile. Talk held at the 48th Annual Symposium of Vertebrate Palaeontology and Comparative Anatomy, 1 September 2000, Portsmouth, UK. 
 

 External links 
 Photo of some Calvert Formation specimens (and some of the disputed Oregon fossils) at National Museum of Natural History. Retrieved 2009-AUG-21.
 From the collections, Part 4 - Article on Calvert Formation material of ?Pelagornis'' sp. 2. at Virginia Museum of Natural History Retrieved 2010-SEP-18.

Pelagornithidae
Chattian genus first appearances
Pleistocene genus extinctions
Miocene birds
Pleistocene animals of Africa
Miocene birds of Australia
Neogene birds of Europe
Neogene France
Miocene birds of North America
Neogene United States
Miocene birds of South America
Montehermosan
Huayquerian
Chasicoan
Mayoan
Laventan
Santacrucian
Colhuehuapian
Neogene Chile
Neogene Peru
Neogene Venezuela
Fossils of Australia
Fossils of Chile
Fossils of France
Fossils of Morocco
Fossils of North Carolina
Fossils of Peru
Fossils of Portugal
Fossils of Venezuela
Fossil taxa described in 1857